Nshan Erzrumyan (born on 17 December 1979 in Yerevan, Soviet Armenia) is a former Armenian football striker. Nshan was the highest goal scorer in the 2005 season and the second highest scorer in the 2006 season with 22 goals. He was a member of the Armenia national team, and has 2 caps since his debut in 2005.

External links 
 

1979 births
Living people
Armenian footballers
Armenia international footballers
Armenian expatriate footballers
FC Pyunik players
FC Urartu players
FC Ararat Yerevan players
FC SKA Rostov-on-Don players
Expatriate footballers in Russia
Armenian Premier League players
Association football forwards